The information regarding List of rivers in the Magallanes Region on this page has been compiled from the data supplied by GeoNames. It includes all features named "Rio", "Canal", "Arroyo", "Estero" and those Feature Code is associated with a stream of water. This list contains 173 water streams.

Content
This list contains:
 Name of the stream, in Spanish Language
 Coordinates are latitude and longitude of the feature in ± decimal degrees, at the mouth of the stream
 Link to a map including the Geonameid (a number which uniquely identifies a Geoname feature)
 Feature Code explained in 
 Other names for the same feature, if any
 Basin countries additional to Chile, if any

List

 Rio Diablo3859387STM(Rio Diablo, Río Diablo)(AR, CL)
 Arroyo Zanja Honda3867568STM(Arroyo Zanja Honda, Rio Zanja Honda, Río Zanja Honda, Zanja Honda)(AR)
 Rio VizcachasRío Vizcachas3832476STM(Rio Vizcachas, Rio Vizcanchas, Río Vizcachas, Río Vizcanchas)(CL)
 Arroyo Guillermo3892273STM(Arroyo Guillermo, Rio Don Guillermo, Río Don Guillermo)(AR)
 Rio ChicoRío Chico3895173STM(Rio Carmen Silva, Rio Carmen Sylva, Rio Chico, Río Carmen Silva, Río Carmen Sylva, Río Chico) (AR)

  Rio TrinidadRío Trinidad3869075STM
  Rio BarrancoRío Barranco3898710STM(Rio Barranco, Rio Barrancos, Río Barranco, Río Barrancos)
  Rio BarrosoRío Barroso3898639STM
  Rio BandurriaRío Bandurria3898838STM
  Rio de los CaiquenesRío de los Caiquenes3897401STM(Rio de los Caiquenes, Rio los Colquenes, Río de los Caiquenes, Río los Colquenes)
  Rio ZamoraRío Zamora3867579STM
  Rio BagualesRío Baguales3898995STM
  Rio del HieloRío del Hielo3888047STM
  Rio de las ChinasRío de las Chinas3895041STM
  Rio Tres PasosRío Tres Pasos3869168STM
  Arroyo Picana3876339STM
  Rio SerranoRío Serrano3870984STM(Rio Serrano, Río Serrano)
  Rio PaineRío Paine3877733STM
 Asencio River
 Dickson River
  Rio GeikieRío Geikie3889041STM (Geike)
  Rio de GreyRío de Grey3888698STM
  Río Pingo7303811STM
 Tyndall River
  Arroyo Prat3875208STM
  Rio SofiaRío Sofía3870746STM
  Rio RivasRío Rivas3873055STM
  Rio PratRío Prat3875198STM
  Rio BoleadoresRío Boleadores3898124STM(Rio Boleadoras, Rio Boleadores, Río Boleadoras, Río Boleadores)
  Rio NatalesRío Natales3879001STM
  Rio de las Casas ViejasRío de las Casas Viejas3896332STM
  Rio TranquiloRío Tranquilo3869305STM
  Rio HollenbergRío Hollenberg3887979STM(Rio Hollemberg, Rio Hollenberg, Rio Hollomberg, Río Hollemberg, Río Hollenberg, Río Hollomberg)
  Chorrillo de los Alambres3900304STM(Chorrillo de los Alambres, Rio Chorrillo de los Alambres, Rio de los Alambres, Río Chorrillo de los Alambres, Río de los Alambres)
  Golondrina RioGolondrina Río3888943STM
  Rio Vegas MalasRío Vegas Malas3868530STM
  Rio de Los PozuelosRío de Los Pozuelos3881494STM
  Rio del MedioRío del Medio3880158STM
  Chorrillo Meric3880015STM(Chorrillo Meric, Estero Merjo)
  Chorrillo La Leona3885479STM(Chorrillo La Leona, Chorrillo Las Lomas, Rio Las Lomas, Río Las Lomas)
  Chorrillo Wagner3867949STM(Chorrillo Wagner, Rio de la Jeannette, Río de la Jeannette)
  Chorrillo El Manzano3891078STM(Chorrillo El Manzano, Rio Malpaso, Rio Manzano, Río Malpaso, Río Manzano)
  Rio CuevasRío Cuevas3893101STM
  Rio PintoRío Pinto3875869STM
  Rio HaaseRío Haase3888220STM(Rio Haase, Rio Hass, Rio Husse, Rio de las Minas, Río Haase, Río Husse, Río de las Minas)
  Rio PerezRío Pérez3876502STM
  Chorrillo El Salto3890435STM(Chorrillo El Salto, Rio El Salto, Río El Salto)
  Rio VerdeRío Verde3868409STM(Rio Verde, Río Verde)
  Arroyo Virasoro3868089STM
  Rio CalafateRío Calafate3897352STM
  Rio Santa SusanaRío Santa Susana3871367STM
  Rio PratRío Prat3875197STM
  Cuarto Chorrillo3893208STM(Cuarto Chorrillo, Cuarto Chorrillos, Rio Cuarto, Río Cuarto)
  Rio SideRío Side3870928STM
  Rio VaqueriaRío Vaquería3868606STM
  Rio PantanosRío Pantanos3877289STM(Rio Pantano, Rio Pantanos, Río Pantano, Río Pantanos)
  Rio PalosRío Palos3877537STM
  Arroyo Las Minas3884166STM
  Estero Valenzuela3868683STM
  Rio OscarRío Oscar3877960STM
  Estero Cortado3893412STM(Arroyo Cortado, Estero Cortado)
  Arroyo Rogers3872938STM
  Estero Bellavista3898463STM(Estero Bellavista, Rio Bella Vista, Río Bella Vista)
  Rio O'HigginsRío O’Higgins3878159STM
  Rio PescadoRío Pescado3876446STM(Rio Pescado, Rio Pezcado, Río Pescado, Río Pezcado)
  Estero Campanario3897076STM(Estero Campanario, Rio Campanario, Río Campanario)
  Rio de los PatosRío de los Patos3876979STM(Chorrillo Los Patos, Rio de los Patos, Rio los Palos, Río de los Patos, Río los Palos)
  Estero Pantanito3877294STM
  Rio GrandeRío Grande3888772STM
  Estero Banco3898857STM(Chorrillo Banco, Estero Banco)
  Rio VerdeRío Verde3868408STM
  Estero La Mina Rica3879826STM(Chorrillo Mina Rica, Estero La Mina Rica, Estero Mina Rica, Rio Mina Rica, Río Mina Rica)
  Estero Moneda3879515STM(Chorrillo Moneda, Estero Moneda)
  Estero Chabunco3895815STM(Estero Chabunco, Rio Chabunco, Río Chabunco)
  Rio de los PalosRío de los Palos3877535STM
  Chorrillo del Medio3880198STM(Chorrillo del Medio, Estero del Medio)
  Estero del Indio3887256STM
  Chorrillo Corey3893564STM(Chorrillo Corey, Estero Corey)
  Estero Guanacos3888466STM(Chorrillo Guanacos, Estero Guanacos)
  Estero La Paz3885062STM
  Arroyo de la Puerta3875010STM(Arroyo La Puerta, Arroyo de la Puerta)
  Estero Rio SecoEstero Río Seco3871051STM(Estero Rio Seco, Estero Río Seco, Rio Seco, Río Seco)
  Estero Doce de Febrero3892341STM
  Estero Tesoro3869931STM
  Estero San Antonio3872377STM
  Rio GrandeRío Grande3888771STM
  Estero Las Heras3884330STM(Estero La Heras, Estero Las Heras)
  Chorrillo Bitsh3898371STM(Chorrillo Bitsh, Estero Bistch, Estero Bitsh)
  Rio Tres PuentesRío Tres Puentes3869153STM
  Estero Horquetas3887834STM(Chorrillo Horquetas, Estero Horquetas)
  Estero Carrera3896530STM(Estero Carrera, Estero Carreras)
  Estero Bueras3897791STM
  Rio El CaneloRío El Canelo3891765STM(Canelo, Rio El Canelas, Rio El Canelo, Río El Canelas, Río El Canelo)
  Rio de las MinasRío de las Minas3879808STM(Rio Las Minas, Rio de las Minas, Río Las Minas, Río de las Minas)
  Rio ChinaRío China3895046STM
  Rio de la ManoRío de la Mano3880692STM(Rio La Mano, Rio de la Mano, Río La Mano, Río de la Mano)
  Rio de los CiervosRío de los Ciervos3894646STM(Rio Los Ciervos, Rio de los Ciervos, Río Los Ciervos, Río de los Ciervos)
  Arroyo Onas3878068STM(Arroyo Ona, Arroyo Onas)
  Rio La CaletaRío La Caleta3886394STM(Rio La Caleta, Rio la Caleta, Río La Caleta, Río la Caleta)
  Estero Casa de Lata3896396STM(Arroyo Casa de Lata, Estero Casa de Lata)
  Rio LenaduraRío Leñadura3883407STM(Rio Lenadura, Rio Lenaduras, Río Leñadura, Río Leñaduras)
  Rio Tres BrazosRío Tres Brazos3869228STM
  Rio PorvenirRío Porvenir3875354STM
  Rio SerranoRío Serrano3870983STM
  Estero Guairabo3888580STM(Chorrillo del Guairabo, Estero Guairabo)
  Estero Wickham3867859STM
  Estero Pike3876030STM
  Rio NuevoRío Nuevo3878443STM(Rio Celmira, Rio Nuevo, Río Nuevo)
  Estero El Guanaco3891300STM
  Rio CentenarioRío Centenario3896001STM
  Rio DiscordiaRío Discordia3892391STM
  Rio Santa MariaRío Santa María3871465STM
  Rio ConcordiaRío Concordia3893853STM
  Estero Nacimiento3879121STM(Estero Nacimi, Estero Nacimiento)
  Rio ValenzuelaRío Valenzuela3868676STM
  Rio Santa MariaRío Santa María3871464STM(Rio Santa Maria, Rio de los Lavaderos, Río Santa María)
  Estero EganaEstero Egaña3892064STM
  Rio Agua FrescaRío Agua Fresca3900486STM(Arroyo Agua Fresca, Rio Agua Fresca, Rio de Agua Fresco, Río Agua Fresca, Río de Agua Fresco)
  Rio PantanosRío Pantanos3877288STM(Rio Pantano, Rio Pantanos, Río Pantanos)
  Rio EsperanzaRío Esperanza3889826STM
  Rio AmarilloRío Amarillo3899796STM
  Rio RosarioRío Rosario3872803STM(Rio Ossa, Rio Rosario, Río Rosario)
  Rio MarazziRío Marazzi3880545STM(Rio Marazzi, Rio Odioso, Río Marazzi)
  Rio HondoRío Hondo3887915STM
  Rio TorcidoRío Torcido3869610STM
  Estero Thomson3869902STM
  Estero San JoseEstero San José3872091STM
  Estero Esmeralda3889891STM
  Estero Daly3892752STM(Estero Dale, Estero Daly)
  Rio PerezRío Pérez3876501STM
  Estero del Padre3877796STM
  Rio BatchelorRío Batchelor3898610STM(Rio Barchelot, Rio Batchelor, Rio de Massacre, Rio del Bachiller, Rio del Gran Valle, Río Batchelor)
  Rio BautistaRío Bautista3898583STM(Rio Baustismo, Rio Bautismo, Rio Bautista, Río Baustismo, Río Bautismo, Río Bautista)
  Rio MacKlellandRío MacKlelland3881076STM(Rio MacClelland, Rio MacKlelland, Río MacClelland, Río MacKlelland)
  Rio San JuanRío San Juan3872007STM(Rio Grave, Rio San Juan, Río San Juan)
  Rio NogueiraRío Nogueira3878571STM(Rio Ner, Rio Nogueira, Río Ner, Río Nogueira)
  Rio GreenRío Green3888712STM
  Rio AnaRío Ana3899755STM
  Rio San BernabeRío San Bernabé3872350STM
  Rio MoritzRío Moritz3879331STM(Rio Green, Rio Moritz, Río Green, Río Moritz)
  Rio BlancoRío Blanco3898193STM
  Rio ChegneauxRío Chegneaux3895300STM
  Rio NavarroRío Navarro3878982STM(Estero Navarro, Rio Navarro, Río Navarro)
  Rio WoodsendRío Woodsend3867796STM
  Estero HuascarEstero Huáscar3887760STM(Chorrillo Huascar, Chorrillo Huáscar, Estero Huascar, Estero Huáscar)
  Rio MunizagaRío Munizaga3879177STM
  Estero Evans3889674STM(Estero Evans, Rio Evans, Río Evans)
  Estero Wilson3867820STM
  Rio San JoseRío San José3872086STM
  Rio ZapataRío Zapata3867529STM
  Rio DonosoRío Donoso3892253STM(Rio Donosa, Rio Donoso, Río Donosa, Río Donoso)(CL)
  Rio GennesRío Gennes3889014STM(Rio De Gennes, Rio Gennes, Río De Gennes, Río Gennes)
  Rio OroRío Oro3877986STM
  Rio JaponRío Japón3886969STM
  Rio RusphenRío Rusphen3872673STM(Rio Ausphen, Rio Rusphen, Río Ausphen, Río Rusphen)
  Estero Ganchos3889139STM
  Rio FoxRío Fox3889374STM
  Rio LatorreRío Latorre3883688STM
  Rio RiverosRío Riveros3873040STM
  Rio CochraneRío Cochrane3894475STM
  Rio BlancoRío Blanco3898192STM
  Rio Santa LudgardaRío Santa Ludgarda3871489STM
  Rio GrandeRío Grande3888770STM
  Rio ParaleloRío Paralelo3877209STM
  Rio de VeerRío de Veer3868550STM
  Rio AzopardoRío Azopardo3899060STM(Rio Azopardo, Rio Leopardo, Río Azopardo, Río Leopardo)
  Rio MascarelloRío Mascarello3880392STM
  Rio FontaineRío Fontaine3889407STM
  Rio BetbederRío Betbeder3898398STM
  Rio RocaRío Roca3872995STM
  Canal UnionCanal Unión3950112CHN
  Rio LapataiaRío Lapataia3885068STM
  Rio Uquika3965622STM
  Canal Thomson3950095CHN
  Rio DouglasRío Douglas3892201STM
 Yendegaia River

See also
 List of lakes in Chile
 List of volcanoes in Chile
 List of islands of Chile
 List of fjords, channels, sounds and straits of Chile
 List of lighthouses in Chile

Notes

References

External links
 Rivers of Chile
 Base de Datos Hidrográfica de Chile
 

Magallanes